The 1998 British Academy Television Awards were held on 18 May at the Prince of Wales Theatre in London. The ceremony was broadcast on ITV, hosted by Bob Monkhouse, and it was the first occasion since 1968 that the Television Awards had been held separately from the British Academy Film Awards, instead of as a joint ceremony.

Winners and nominees
Winners are listed first and highlighted in boldface; the nominees are listed below.

Craft Awards

Special Award
 Roger Cook

References

External links
British Academy Craft Awards official website

1998
1998 awards in the United Kingdom
1998 television awards
1998 in British television
May 1998 events in the United Kingdom